KPTY (1330 AM, "107.3 Hank FM") is a radio station serving the Waterloo/Cedar Falls metropolitan area with a classic country format. It broadcasts on AM frequency 1330 kHz and is under ownership of NRG Radio, LLC.

History
On June 12, 1947 the Federal Communications Commission granted a construction permit to Black Hawk Broadcasting Company for a radio station in Waterloo, Iowa. Less than five months later, Black Hawk President R.J. McElroy made the launch of KWWL a reality. The station began broadcasting on 1320 kHz, operating at 1,000 watts of power in studio space once occupied by WMT in the Hotel Russell-Lamson. The frequency changed to 1330 a short time later, operating at 5,000 watts. KWWL was a very popular Top 40 station until the format moved to co-owned sister station KFMW in 1982.  KWLO's format moved to Adult Contemporary and evolved into Full Service. In the summer of 1993, KWLO switched music formats from Lite AC to Oldies, adopting "Oldies 1330" as a moniker. The new format maintained existing Full Service news and talk programming as well as local features like Buy, Sell, & Trade, a Tradio program. After KWLO and KFMW were purchased by Bahakel Communications in 1996, the Adult Standards format that was on KXEL moved to KWLO. For a time, it was syndicating a combined Oldies/Adult Standards format courtesy of Citadel Media's "Timeless" satellite feed. With that network's demise on February 13, 2010, KWLO slightly tweaked their format and switched over to Dial Global's Kool Gold Oldies network. On July 1, 2012, KWLO's format changed to sports.

McElroy formed KWWL-TV in 1953 and KWWL-FM (now KFMW) in 1968. In 1981, KWWL became KWLO with the sale of the Black Hawk Broadcasting Company to Forward Communications. The station was purchased by Bahakel Communications in 1996 and then purchased in April 2012 along with Bahakel's other Waterloo radio stations by Woodward Communications, Inc. Woodward Communications sold KWLO and three sister stations to NRG Radio's NRG License Sub, LLC effective December 1, 2014, at a price of $3.55 million.

On June 28, 2015 at midnight, KWLO flipped to Top 40/CHR, branded as "107.3 The Party" (simulcast on translator K297BS 107.3 FM Waterloo). On July 9, 2015, KWLO changed their call letters to KPTY to go with the "Party" branding.

On January 31, 2020, after playing “Him & I” by G-Eazy and Halsey, KPTY flipped to classic country, branded as "107.3 Hank FM". The first song on “Hank FM” was “Live Until I Die” by Clay Walker.

References

External links
KPTY website

PTY
Classic country radio stations in the United States
Radio stations established in 1947
1947 establishments in Iowa
NRG Media radio stations